Echidnopsis is a genus of succulent, cactus-like plants in the family Apocynaceae, first described as a genus in 1871. They are native to eastern Africa and the Arabian Peninsula.

Accepted species

Species formerly included
Echidnopsis quadrangula now  Caralluma quadrangula

Taxonomy 
Phylogenetic studies have shown the genus to be monophyletic, and most closely related to the genus Rhytidocaulon. Marginally more distantly related is a sister branch comprising the genus Pseudolithos and the widespread Caralluma stapeliads of North Africa.

References

Apocynaceae genera
Asclepiadoideae
Taxa named by Joseph Dalton Hooker